The Able Label was an independent record label from Brisbane, Australia.

Whilst several Brisbane based bands had released their own independent singles, Able Label was the first to cater for a number of acts. The Go-Betweens released their first two singles, "Lee Remick" and "People Say", on the label in 1978 and 1979. It allowed a number of other Brisbane groups, The Numbers (later to become The Riptides), The Apartments and the Four Gods to press their own records using the Able Label logo. Not all bands were permitted to use the Able Label logo, one such band was Razar who were refused permission to use the logo on their seminal 1978 single "Task Force". The band were accused of appropriating the label's name, with the single using the catalogue number AB002. The most likely explanation is that it was a manufacturing error by the pressing plant in Sydney. Able Records were limited pressings ranging from 500 to 700 and are considered collectors' items.

Discography

See also
 Lists of record labels

References

External links
 Able Logo image

Australian independent record labels
Defunct record labels of Australia
Indie rock record labels